Yuzhno-Sakhalinsk Airport, also called Khomutovo, is an airport in Yuzhno-Sakhalinsk, on the Russian island of Sakhalin. The airport was established in 1945 as a military airfield. With currently one 3,400 m concrete runway, one passenger terminal, two cargo terminals and 16 aircraft stands, Yuzhno-Sakhalinsk Airport is the largest airport in Sakhalin Oblast.

Facilities

Airlines and destinations

Passenger

Cargo

References

External links
  
 
 
 
 Airport Yuzhno-Sakhalinsk (Homutovo) Aviateka.Handbook

Airports built in the Soviet Union
Airports in Sakhalin Oblast
Sakhalin
Airports established in 1945
1945 establishments in Russia